The World Policy Council of Alpha Phi Alpha fraternity is a nonprofit and nonpartisan think tank established in 1996 at Howard University to expand the fraternity's involvement in politics and social and current policy to encompass important global and world issues. They describe their mission as to "address issues of concern to our brotherhood, our communities, our Nation, and the world."

Among the Council's nine Board of Directors are Senator Edward Brooke, Ambassador Horace Dawson, Congressmen Charles Rangel, and Ron Dellums. The Council's directors also include other ambassadors, theologians, presidents of colleges and foundations, and journalists.

The Council communicates its position through white papers which are disseminated to policymakers, politicians, scholars, journalist, and fraternity chapters. Since its founding the Council has offered an informed opinion on topics such as the AIDS crisis, global warming, Middle East conflict, Nigerian politics and Martin Luther King Jr.'s vision of a World House.

Historical context

Alpha Phi Alpha is an American intercollegiate organization that is the first established by African Americans. Founded on December 4, 1906 on the campus of Cornell University in Ithaca, New York, the fraternity utilizes motifs and artifacts from Ancient Egypt to represent the organization and preserves its archives at the Moorland-Spingarn Research Center.

The leadership of Alpha Phi Alpha recognized early on the need to correct the educational, economic, political, and social injustices faced by African-Americans and the world community and began its continuing commitment of providing scholarships for needy students and initiating various other charitable and service projects.

Alpha Phi Alpha has provided leadership and service during the Great Depression, World Wars, Civil Rights Movements, and addresses social issues such as apartheid, AIDS, urban housing, and other economic, cultural, and political issues affecting people of color. The Martin Luther King Jr. Memorial is a program of Alpha Phi Alpha and the fraternity jointly leads philanthropic programming initiatives with March of Dimes, Head Start, Boy Scouts of America and Big Brothers Big Sisters of America.

Alpha men such as W. E. B. Du Bois, Jesse Owens, Duke Ellington, Thurgood Marshall, Andrew Young, and Martin Luther King Jr. are among the litany of fraternity members who have dedicated their lives to the fraternity's principles of "scholarship, manly deeds, and love for all mankind."

Leadership expansion
The leadership by the fraternity was about to expand when at its 1995 General Convention, Senator Edward Brooke spoke on the need for Alpha Phi Alpha to broaden its view to encompass international concerns. Brooke said "our intellectual power is so great that it ought to be shared ... that we should be giving our thoughts and our opinions on domestic and international issues. General President Milton C. Davis established the World Policy Council (WPC) in 1996 as the analytical body of the fraternity to reflect, engage in dialogue and project what ought to happen in actions that are in-line with the values of Alpha Phi Alpha. The mission of The Alpha Phi Alpha World Policy Council as stated on the fraternity's website

The Council was created with seven board members to research and outline the fraternity's position on issues and policies deemed to be of national or international import. Milton appointed Brooke as the Council's first Chairman and he currently serves as Chairman Emeritus. The Council's membership increased to nine when General President Harry E. Johnson's appointed Congressman Ron Dellums and Cornel West. Johnson also extended the World Policy Council's role to include a lecture series on tolerance and a focus on the issue of the HIV infections and AIDS.

The World Policy Council has studied and issued white papers on the Politics of Nigeria, War on Terrorism, and global warming. The Council garnered international attention in 1999 when it issued a clarion call to Nigeria to release political prisoners and become a force for good on the African continent. The fifth paper was published in 2006 to coincide with the Centenary of Alpha Phi Alpha and among its five topics examined the impact of Black Greek letter organizations in American culture and Hurricane Katrina, the costliest and one of the five deadliest hurricanes in the history of the United States.

The Council distributes the white papers to the White House, Congresses, key national leaders, fraternity chapters, and those whose decisions shape the future. A letter is sent to the office of the President of the United States providing an informed opinion of individuals and constituents on how the President should act to resolve an issue or policy.

Position papers
The WPC presented its first position paper to the fraternity's general membership at the 1996 Alpha Scholarship Forum in New Orleans, Louisiana as part of its inaugural Charles H. Wesley Memorial Scholarship Lecture. The fourth and fifth report were issued in 2002 and 2006 respectively.

Middle East crisis

The Israeli–Palestinian conflict is an ongoing dispute between the State of Israel and the Palestinian people. The Israeli–Palestinian conflict is part of the wider Arab–Israeli conflict, which is essentially a dispute between two national identities with claims over the same area of land.

The roots of the conflict can be traced to the late 19th century, when Zionist Jews expressed their desire to create a modern state in the ancient land of the Israelites, which they considered to be their rightful homeland. To further that objective, the World Zionist Organization encouraged immigration and purchase of land, which was then part of the Ottoman Empire.

According to a 2007 poll of adults in the Gaza Strip and the West Bank by the Jerusalem Media & Communication Center, "46.7 per cent of respondents favour a two-state solution for the Arab–Israeli conflict." In second place came support of a binational state with 26.5%.

The Council's position is,

The Centenary Report
The fifth report by the Council addresses five issues such as the Millennium Challenge Account, Extraordinary rendition, and The World House as envisioned by Martin Luther King Jr.

Millennium Challenge

The Millennium Challenge Account (MCA) is a bilateral development fund created by the Bush administration whose mission is "to reduce global poverty through the promotion of sustainable economic growth" to some of the poorest countries in the world. The MCA is available to fund specific programs targeted at reducing poverty and stimulating economic growth for eligible countries that meet independent and transparent policy indicators.

The Congress of the United States has consistently provided less funding than the president has requested for this new compact for development with accountability for both rich and poor countries. For Fiscal Year 2008, less funding will be provided than was hoped for, and only 1.2 billion is currently budgeted, and the MCA CEO commented that it would undercut the programs efforts.

The Council's position is,

Extraordinary rendition

Extraordinary rendition and irregular rendition are terms used to describe the kidnapping and extrajudicial transfer of a person from one state to another, and the term torture by proxy is used by some critics to describe situations in which the U.S. has purportedly transferred suspected terrorists to countries known to employ harsh interrogation techniques that may rise to the level of torture. It has been alleged that torture has been employed with the knowledge or acquiescence of the United States, although United States Secretary of State Condoleezza Rice stated in an April 2006 radio interview that the United States does not transfer people to places where it is known they will be tortured.

The Council's position is,

The World House
The World House is the vision of Martin Luther King Jr. in which "a family of different races, religions, ideas, cultures and interests must learn to live together as brothers and sisters or perish together as fools." King first articulated his vision of a World House in his Nobel Peace Prize lecture in 1964 "The World House," in which he identified three major threats to human survival—racism, poverty/materialism, and war. He stressed the urgency of addressing these problems, warning that it might be humanity's last chance to choose between chaos and community. The World House Project has said "The September 11, 2001 attacks by terrorist made Dr. King's predictions seem eerily prescient. His vision and agenda may be the key to our survival during the 21st century."

King's vision of a World House calls upon humanity to:

The Council recommends that Alpha Phi Alpha join crusades in this Centenary that are pursuing King's vision and that,

Members

The membership of Alpha Phi Alpha represents the full diversity of policymakers, activists, college presidents, lawyers, businessmen, theologians and other professions among its members. The general president of Alpha Phi Alpha appoints a nonpartisan Board of Directors from this passel of Alpha men to govern the Council. The composition of the Board represents a range of disciplines and approaches to the issues and schema of economic, cultural, political, and policy conditions as they pertain to the social psychology of Black Americans and Africans.

Edward Brooke, a former Senator and Attorney General of the Commonwealth of Massachusetts served and the first chairman and currently chairman emeritus. Former Ambassador Horace Dawson is the current Chairman. Congressman Charles B. Rangel, Dean, New York State Congressional Delegation and founding member of the Congressional Black Caucus, and former Congressman Ron Dellums, president and CEO of HealthCare International. Kenton Keith is a Senior Vice President of Meridian International Center and a former U.S. Ambassador to the State of Qatar. Clathan M. Ross is a Rapporteur and a retired U.S. Foreign Service Information Officer.

Henry Ponder is former President and Chief Executive Officer (CEO) of the National Association for Equal Opportunity in Higher Education and has served as president of Fisk University, Benedict College, and Talladega College, and General President of Alpha Phi Alpha. Bobby William Austin is Vice President for University Relations and Communications at the University of the District of Columbia, President of Austin Institute, former President and CEO of Village Foundation, and former Program Director for the Kellogg National Fellowship Program at W.K. Kellogg Foundation. Cornel West is a current and former professor of religion at Princeton University and Harvard University respectively. Vinton Anderson, the 92nd Bishop of African Methodist Episcopal Church and former president of World Council of Churches.

Former members of the Council include Cornelius Henderson, a United Methodist pastor and bishop, former president of Gammon Theological Seminary, and the first Black pastor of Atlanta, Georgia's Ben Hill United Methodist Church. Clinton Columbus Jones, III served as counsel to the United States House of Representatives Committee on Banking and Financial Services, and Chuck Stone is the Walter Spearman Professor of Journalism at the University of North Carolina, Chapel Hill and a former White House Correspondent.

Citations

Further reading and external links

Further reading

External links
 Alpha Phi Alpha Fraternity website
  

Alpha Phi Alpha "A Century of Leadership" PBS Video
  (16:03 mins)
  (17:25 mins)
  (17:52 mins)
  (17:56 mins)
  (18:25 mins)
  (15:21 mins)
  (7:06 mins)

Alpha Phi Alpha
Organizations established in 1996
Foreign policy and strategy think tanks in the United States
Nonpartisan organizations in the United States
Political and economic think tanks in the United States